Val-des-Bois is a town and municipality in the Papineau Regional County Municipality in the Outaouais region of Quebec, Canada.

The main local economic activity depends on cottage tourism. The eastern half of the municipality is part of the Papineau-Labelle Wildlife Reserve.

Geography
As part of the Laurentian Highlands, its territory is dotted with lakes such Écho, de l'Argile, de l'Aqueduc, Vert, and Delphis.

History
In 1873, the Township of Villeneuve was formed and named after Léonard-Vincent-Léon Villeneuve (1808-1873), member of Society of Saint-Sulpice, professor at the Petit Séminaire de Montréal (1838-1846), and pastor of Oka from 1871 to 1873.

In 1878, the local post office was named "Val-des-Bois". In 1883, the parish of Notre-Dame-de-la-Garde was formed, and two years later, the United Township Municipality of Bowman-et-Villeneuve was established. In 1913, the townships separated, forming the Township Municipality of Bowman and the Township Municipality of Villeneuve. In 1929, James Maclaren began construction on a dam at the High Falls of the Lièvre River, displacing 156 families because of the rising waters. The majority of them where German settlers, the average amount the families received from the MacLaren Co. were, depending on the acreage, between $1000.-- to $2000 each.

In 1958, Villeneuve was renamed to Val-des-Bois (French for "Valley of the Woods"), in reference to the beautiful forest which decorated the banks of the Lièvre River.

On 23 June 2010 a 5.0 earthquake struck the region, with its epicentre 8 km from Val-des-Bois, which was the closest settlement.

Demographics

Mother tongue:
 English as first language: 5.8%
 French as first language: 91.9%
 English and French as first language: 1.2%
 Other as first language: 0.6%

Local government
List of former mayors:

 Marcel Proulx (2001–2013)
 Daniel Rochon (2013-2015)
 Roland Montpetit (2015–present)

References

External links

Incorporated places in Outaouais
Municipalities in Quebec